"Mein Teil" (German for "My part" or "My share", slang for "My penis") is a song by German Neue Deutsche Härte band Rammstein. It was released as the lead single from their fourth studio album, Reise, Reise (2004), on 26 July 2004. "Mein Teil" attracted controversy in Germany; the media dubbed it "Das Kannibalenlied" ("The Cannibal-Song") due to its lyrics referring to the Armin Meiwes cannibalism case, which helped to boost it to second place in the German music charts after its release in early August 2004. It was also a number-one hit in Spain. Remixes of the song were done by Arthur Baker and Pet Shop Boys. "Mein Teil" was nominated for Best Metal Performance at the 48th Grammy Awards but lost to Slipknot's "Before I Forget".

Background and composition
The song is inspired by the case of Armin Meiwes and Bernd Jürgen Armando Brandes. In March 2001, in Rotenburg an der Fulda, the two men aged in their 40s met each other, cut off and cooked Brandes' penis and consumed it together. Afterwards, Meiwes killed Brandeswith Brandes' permissionand ate his remains. As a result, Meiwes was sentenced to eight-and-a-half years in jail for manslaughter, but was later charged with murder and sentenced to life imprisonment. According to bassist Oliver "Ollie" Riedel, the song came about after "one of our members brought a newspaper to rehearsal and it had a story about the cannibal guy in it. We were fascinated, shocked and amused at the same time". Vocalist Till Lindemann stated, "It is so sick that it becomes fascinating and there just has to be a song about it". A prominent phrase in the song is "... denn du bist, was du isst, und ihr wisst, was es ist" ("Because you are what you eat, and you (pl.) know what it is").

Music video 

The video for "Mein Teil" was directed by Zoran Bihac. It depicts Christoph Schneider cross-dressed as Armin Meiwes's mother, Till Lindemann receiving oral sex from an angel (played by Luciana Regina) before he eats her wings and kills her; Christian Lorenz performing ballet in a hallucinatory state; Paul Landers shaking, screaming violently and wandering around in a frantic and crazed state; Richard Kruspe violently fighting with his doppelgänger; Oliver Riedel writhing on the floor in painful spasms with his skin covered in white powder; the band fighting in a mudpit; and Schneider leading the rest of the band on leashes as they crawl out of the Deutsche Oper U-Bahn (subway) station and behave like dogs. At the beginning of the song in the video, the phrase "Suche gut gebauten Achtzehn- bis Dreißigjährigen zum Schlachten – Der Metzgermeister" ("Looking for a well built 18-year-old to 30-year-old to slaughter – The Master Butcher") is spoken, voiced by Riedel, although the album version of the song does not have this beginning. The quote is taken from an online post by Armin Meiwes. The controversy over "Mein Teil" prompted MTV Germany to restrict the airing of the music video to after 11 PM.

Live performances 

It debuted in three consecutive concerts for members of the fan club, in October 2004. This song is one of the most notable live performances of the 2004–2005 Reise, Reise tour. From the central backstage access, Till Lindemann appears pulling a giant cooking pot. He is dressed as a blood-stained chef holding a microphone with a large, real cooking knife attached to the end. Keyboardist Christian "Flake" Lorenz appears in the pot, with metal cylinders attached to his arms and legs, and plays the keyboard during the song. After the second chorus, Till takes a flamethrower and roasts the bottom of the pot, "cooking" Flake. Flake escapes from the pot and starts running around the stage with flames erupting from his arms and legs, while chased by a knife-wielding Till.

When Flake was asked about what it is like to perform this, he said: "It is fine. It is only pain. Although one can not breathe in, because then one would inhale the flames and die". Due to all of the theatrical performance, the song usually extended to six or seven minutes when played live. It was played at every concert of the Ahoi Tour, but was dropped on the Liebe ist für alle da Tour, a move which irritated many fans. However, it returned to playlist for the Latin American leg of the tour in 2010, the Auckland and Perth legs of the Big Day Out festival and the South African leg of the tour in 2011, all replacing "Ich tu dir weh" except on the Brazllian leg of the South America tour, where both songs were played". The song has since returned to the playlist of the Made in Germany 1995–2011 concert tour. They dropped the live performance again in 2016, until 2019, when it was included in the setlist for their Europe Stadium Tour. It has been included on the setlist for the North American Stadium Tour of 2022.

Track listing 
5" CD single
 "Mein Teil"  – 4:23
 "Mein Teil" (You Are What You Eat Edit)  – 4:07
 "Mein Teil" (Return to New York Buffet Mix)  – 7:22
 "Mein Teil" (There Are No Guitars on This Mix)  – 7:20
 The Australian edition also features the "Mein Teil" video.
3" CD single
 "Mein Teil"  – 4:23
 "Mein Teil" (You Are What You Eat Edit)  – 4:07
Also released as a 2-track 5" CD single.

2 x 12" vinyl single (limited to 1000 copies)
 "Mein Teil" (You Are What You Eat Mix)  – 6:45
 "Mein Teil" (You Are What You Eat Instrumental Mix)  – 7:00
 "Mein Teil" (The Return to New York Buffet Mix)  – 7:22
 "Mein Teil" (The Return to New York Buffet Instrumental Mix)  – 7:23

Charts

Weekly charts

Year-end charts

References

Citations
 "Strange tastes", Sunday Herald Sun (Melbourne, Australia), 24 October 2004
 "German cannibal inspires hard rockers Rammstein to new hit", Agence France Presse, 27 August 2004
 "Shock'n'roll Circus", The Times (London), 29 January 2005

External links 
 

Songs about cannibalism
2004 singles
2004 songs
Music video controversies
Rammstein songs
German-language songs
Number-one singles in Spain
Obscenity controversies in music
Songs based on actual events
Songs written by Christian Lorenz
Songs written by Christoph Schneider
Songs written by Oliver Riedel
Songs written by Paul Landers
Songs written by Richard Z. Kruspe
Songs written by Till Lindemann